Robert Sandford (died 1403/4), of Sandford and Burton, Westmorland, was an English Member of Parliament.

Family
Sandford was the son of the MP, Thomas Sandford and his wife, Mary. Robert married a woman named Margaret and they had two daughters. Margaret outlived him and she raised his children with her next husband, also an MP, Sir Robert Leybourne.

Career
He was a Member (MP) of the Parliament of England for Westmorland in September 1388.

References

14th-century births
1403 deaths
English MPs September 1388
People from Burton-in-Kendal